Edna Thomas may refer to:
 Edna Harker Thomas, leader in the Church of Jesus Christ of Latter-day Saints
 Edna Thomas (footballer), Papua New Guinean footballer and manager